Murzilka is a popular Soviet/Russian illustrated magazine for 6–12 year olds. It has been published since May 1924.

History and profile	
At the end of the 19th century the Canadian illustrator and writer Palmer Cox created a cycle of poems about little people brownie. Later the Russian author Anna Hvolson started writing stories based on his drawings about little forest men. She called the main character who wore a white tie, had a walking stick and a monocle "Murzilka".

The first issue of the magazine came out on 16 May 1924 in the Soviet Union. Here Murzilka was a small white dog and appeared with his owner Petya. The magazine is still published on a monthly basis.

In 1937 the illustrator Aminadav Kanevsky created the new design of Murzilka – now a yellow furry character in a red beret with a scarf and a camera over his shoulder.

Murzilka started the creative careers of writers such as Samuil Marshak, Sergey Mikhalkov, Elena Blaginina, Boris Zahoder, Agniya Barto, Nikolay Nosov, Marina Uspenskaya, and of artist and writer Georgy Kovenchuk. 

In 2011 the magazine was listed by the Guinness World Records as the longest running children's magazine in the world.

References

External links
Official website 
Old official website 
Archive 1924-1991 

1924 establishments in the Soviet Union
Magazines established in 1924
Magazines published in Moscow
Children's magazines published in Russia
Comics magazines published in Russia
Monthly magazines published in Russia
Russian-language magazines
Magazines published in the Soviet Union